fa:کوپر لیک (ریزپردازنده)

Cooper Lake is Intel's codename for the third-generation of their Xeon scalable processors, developed as the successor to Cascade Lake. Cooper Lake processors are targeted at the 4S and 8S segments of the server market; Ice Lake-SP serves the 1S and 2S segment.

Features
Cooper Lake was launched on June 18, 2020 and features up to 28 cores. Aside from a few microarchitectural changes, Cooper Lake's microarchitecture is mostly identical to Skylake. Cooper Lake features faster memory support (DDR4-3200 over DDR4-2933), support for second-generation Optane memory, and double the UPI links over Cascade Lake. Cooper Lake is the first x86 CPU to support the new bfloat16 instruction set as a part of Intel's Deep Learning Boost.

Improvements 

New bfloat16 instruction
Support for up to 12 DIMMs of DDR4 memory per CPU socket
 Xeon Platinum supports up to eight sockets; Xeon Gold supports up to four sockets; Xeon Silver and Bronze support up to two sockets
 -H: up to 1.12TB DDR4 per socket
 -HL: Large DDR memory  tier support (up to 4.5TB)

List of Cooper Lake processors

Xeon Platinum (octa processor)

Xeon Gold (quad processor)

References 

Skylake microarchitecture
Intel microarchitectures
Transactional memory
Intel Xeon (Cooper Lake)
X86 microarchitectures